The 1997–98 Esiliiga is the seventh season of the Esiliiga, second-highest Estonian league for association football clubs, since its establishment in 1992.

Main tournament
Four best teams qualify to the Premier Division promotion play-off, other four to First Division promotion play-off.

Table

Top scorers

Premier Division promotion play-off
None of the four Esiliiga teams were able to finish in the top two, so that they all remain in the second level of Estonian football system.

Table

Top scorers

First Division promotion play-off
Veteran Kohtla-Järve and KSK Vigri Tallinn were the two lucky teams to be promoted, both from Second Division Northern zone. On the other hand, two teams, JK Dünamo Tallinn and Tallinna Jalgpallikool, were relegated.

Table

See also
1997–98 Meistriliiga
1997 in Estonian football
1998 in Estonian football

Esiliiga seasons
2
2
Estonia